Lawfare is an American blog dedicated to national security issues, published by the Lawfare Institute in cooperation with the Brookings Institution. It has received attention for articles on Donald Trump's presidency.

Background 
The blog was started in September 2010 by Benjamin Wittes (a former editorial writer for The Washington Post), Harvard Law School professor Jack Goldsmith, and University of Texas at Austin law professor Robert Chesney. Goldsmith was the head of the Office of Legal Counsel in the George W. Bush administration's Justice Department, and Chesney served on a detention-policy task force in the Obama administration. Its writers include law professors, law students, and former George W. Bush and Barack Obama administration officials.

Donald Trump 

Lawfare's coverage of intelligence and legal matters related to the Trump administration has brought the blog significant increases in readership and national attention. In January 2017, the website's traffic was up by 1,101% from 12 months before.

Executive Order 13769 

In January 2017 President Donald Trump tweeted "LAWFARE" and quoted a line from one of its blog posts that criticized the reasoning in the Ninth Circuit Court of Appeals ruling that blocked Trump's first refugee-and-travel ban. Trump  tweeted the excerpt minutes after the line was quoted on Morning Joe. Wittes, who supported the court ruling, criticized Trump for the tweet, asserting that Trump distorted the argument presented in the article. Wittes also wrote that it was disturbing that Trump cited the line "with apparently no idea who the author was or what the publication was, and indeed without reading the rest of the article", and that no one in the White House vetted the tweet.

Dismissal of FBI Director James Comey 

On May 18, 2017, Lawfare's editor-in-chief Benjamin Wittes was the principal source of an extensive New York Times report about President Trump's interactions with FBI Director James Comey, who is a friend of Wittes, and how those interactions related to Comey's subsequent firing. Wittes also provided a 25-minute interview to PBS NewsHour on the same subject. According to him, Trump's hug "disgusted" Comey. Wittes said Comey was not expecting a hug, adding "It was bad enough there was going to be a handshake." According to Wittes, Comey had been "disgusted" with Trump's attempts to publicly ingratiate himself with Comey, which Comey saw as calculated attempts to compromise him by agitating Democrats. Wittes elaborated on this shortly thereafter in a post on Lawfare.

Trump's disclosure of classified intelligence 

Several Lawfare contributors argued that Trump's reported disclosure of classified intelligence to Russia in mid-May 2017 was "perhaps the gravest allegation of presidential misconduct in the scandal-ridden four months of the Trump administration". The column further alleged that Trump's reported actions "may well be a violation of the President's oath of office".

Reception 
Columnist David Ignatius described Lawfare as "one of the most fair-minded chroniclers of national security issues". According to Daniel W. Drezner, professor of international politics at the Fletcher School of Law and Diplomacy at Tufts University, Lawfare is an example of "outside intellectuals" who "exercised real influence in the Trump era".

The blog has been criticized by attorney and journalist Glenn Greenwald. Writing in The New York Times he said the blog has a "courtier Beltway mentality" devoted to "serving, venerating and justifying the acts of those in power".

References

External links

2010 establishments in the United States
Publications established in 2010
Internet properties established in 2010
American political blogs
National security of the United States
American legal websites